Dina Blond (1 March 1887 - 1985) was a prominent member of the Jewish Labour Bund in Poland and a prolific Yiddish translator. She translated over 30 works of world literature into Yiddish from German, English, and Russian.

She was born Shayne-Feygl Szapiro in Vilna, then a part of the Russian Empire.

In the mid-1920s Blond became chairwoman of the Bund's women's organisation, the Yidisher Arbeter Froy (YAF). She was also editor of the women's page of the party newspaper, Folkstsaytung.

References

1877 births
1985 deaths
American socialist feminists
American people of Lithuanian-Jewish descent
Bundists
Feminists from the Russian Empire
General Jewish Labour Bund in Poland politicians
Jews from the Russian Empire
Jewish feminists
Jewish socialists
Lithuanian Jews
Lithuanian socialist feminists
People from New York City
Polish socialist feminists
Russian socialist feminists
Writers from Vilnius
Writers from Warsaw
Translators from English
Translators from German
Translators from Russian
Translators to Yiddish
Women's page journalists
Polish emigrants to the United States